Saâdeddine Zmerli (January 7, 1930 – March 26, 2021) was a Tunisian urologist and politician. He spent twelve years in France, ten years in Algeria and eighteen years in Tunisia.

Biography
In 1973, Saâdeddine left Algeria, eight years after a convocation from the Tunisian president Bourguiba who asked him to create the urology service in Charles Nicolle hospital in Tunis.

From July 25, 1988 to April 10, 1989 Pr. Zmerli was nominated as the Minister of Health.

References

Health ministers of Tunisia
1930 births
2021 deaths
People from Tunis Governorate
Urologists